Admiral Halsey may refer to:
U.S. Fleet Admiral William Halsey Jr., (1882–1959)
The Paul McCartney song "Uncle Albert/Admiral Halsey", referring to the U.S. Admiral
British Admiral Lionel Halsey, (1872–1949)